is an anime television series conceptualized by Manglobe and produced by Aniplex, Fuji TV, Kyoraku Industrial Holdings, Dentsu, Hobibox, Movic and DeNA. It is directed by Takahiro Omori, with Hideyuki Kurata handling series scripts, Chinatsu Kurahana and Yoshimitsu Yamashita designing the characters, Masaki Yamada serving as main animator, and Agehasprings and Kenji Tamai composing the music. The anime started airing on Fuji TV's noitaminA block on October 10, 2013. It focuses on Masayoshi Hazama, a young adult who aspires to become a superhero despite having no superpowers. In doing so, he meets several people who support his cause. Aniplex of America has licensed the series for North America. A manga series by Seiko Takagi and Shō Mizusawa was also published by Square Enix.

Plot
Male model Masayoshi Hazama decides to fulfill his childhood dream of becoming a superhero, despite having no superpowers or the technology to create a high-powered suit. He becomes the hero Samurai Flamenco and begins to fight crime in the name of justice. Police officer Hidenori Gotō finds out about Samurai Flamenco and his real identity by a twist of fate, which leads to him getting involved into much trouble, especially when they come across enemies that were not thought to exist outside of fiction. Nonetheless, these two young men will come face to face with hardships of being crime-fighters while discovering what it truly means to be a hero of justice.

Characters

Main characters
 

He has a love for tokusatsu shows since he was a child, which came from his grandfather, who invented the Samurai Flamenco project and raised Masayoshi after his parents were killed in a mugging overseas. Originally confronting regular thugs in his alternate persona, Masayoshi starts fighting real monsters from the "Torture" organization when they start threatening the city. After defeating From Beyond, Masayoshi becomes a fugitive of the government, becoming Samurai Flamenco once more, and soon learns that a being calling itself Alien Flamenco has been orchestrating events from the very beginning. When not fighting, Masayoshi has a shy demeanor, thus he is usually dominated by other people such as Mari and Joji. He is 20 years old. Masayoshi prefers being addressed by his given name, regardless of the addressee, as it literally means "justice."

A policeman who is diligent in his work, but doesn't have a strong sense of justice. He finds out who Samurai Flamenco is one day, and his daily life has become busy and troublesome since. He claims to have a long distance relationship with his girlfriend, and routinely refuses jobs centered around Masayoshi's activities. He eventually comes to understand and respect Masayoshi's idea of justice, even though he does not completely agree with it. He is 24 years old. It is revealed in the final story arc that Hidenori's girlfriend has been missing for years, and that Hidenori has been texting himself and saving all of her texts from before her disappearance in order to keep his sanity. Haiji uses this against him by tying him up and deleting all of his girlfriend's texts, so that he could drive Hidenori mad and force him to kill him.

Mineral Miracle Muse / Flamenco Girls
 

 One of the members of the female idol group , who serves as the composer and lyricist. Her talents and bright, energetic personality makes it easier to get along with everybody. As opposed to Masayoshi's traditional sense of justice, Mari uses a more brutal, vengeance-based method of taking down criminals. Mari has a fetish for men in uniform, as she begins to blush whenever she sees Hidenori wearing his police uniform and tries to get him to dress up for her. After being kidnapped and tortured by King Torture, Mari develops a distant, angry personality and a hatred for superheroes, living and hiding at Hidenori's apartment. She later explains to her companions that she went into hiding out of shame and feelings of inferiority towards Moe, reconciling with her friends and taking up the Flamenco Diamond identity once more. She is 18 years old.

 

She is 19 years old and is from the Kansai region. She was later poisoned before a concert by Haiji as part of his agitation on Masayoshi.

 

 One of the members of Mineral Miracle Muse, she later becomes , the third Flamenco Girl. She is a high-school student with a reserved, yet carefree personality. Moe is attracted to Mari, who often kisses her in moments of passion. She is also a native English speaker. She is 17 years old. While kidnapped by King Torture, she offers for him to take her and let Mari go free, getting her finger crushed in the process. After finding Mari in hiding, she learns that Mari ran away because of feelings of inferiority towards her. The two reconcile with a kiss and the Flamenco Girls become heroes again. Like Mizuki, she was also poisoned by Haiji.

Samurai Sentai Flamenger

In his spare time he farms with and cares for his sickly grandfather, who is attacked by Haiji later on to agitate Masayoshi. He is 24 years old.

 

She enjoys knitting despite considering it an overly feminine hobby and joined the team because of her crush on her "darling" Joji Kaname, which causes constant friction with Kaname's wife. She hails from a rich family, but was disowned because of her obsession with Kaname. They accept her again after the world-threatening danger is over. Momoi is incredibly proud of her long hair, and is traumatized when Haiji Sawada cuts it.

 

He originally rejected Masayoshi's position as the leader, wanting to be Flamen Red himself due to his friendship and dedication to Joji, but eventually grows to respect Masayoshi. Despite looking very young, he is the oldest member of the team at 28 years old. He has been friends with Joji for about ten years and eventually works with him, acting in superhero shows as the hero "Neo Axe." Haiji later used Soichi's connections with Joji as a premise to trash his apartment and destroy any Red Axe memorabilia in order to agitate Masayoshi.

 

 The stoic member of the "Flamengers" who becomes , number IV, the team's strategist and tactical analyst. He is 22 years old, having a sister and young niece in town. When he later goes to graduate school after the defeat of Alien Flamenco, he acquires a number of female fans, who cause him constant annoyance. Midorikawa is passionate about learning and cares deeply for his young niece, weaknesses that Haiji Sawada exploits along with shredding and destroying his favorite book.

Antagonists

King Torture is a criminal who loves torturing his victims. All of the monsters he sends to Japan are hypnotized by him and commit crimes that slowly become more ridiculous and pointless in order to appear harmless and draw attention away from King Torture's ultimate plan to unite all of humanity into a single hive-minded monster to create true "evil" peace. He was a boy who was taken with superheroism just like Masayoshi, only in his case he was taken with the evil side instead of the just, as he claims superheroism is a pointless, thankless job which never leads to the peace that heroes promise. He claims that the monsters he sent all agreed to the transformation procedure and willingly put their lives on the line for their shared dream, and as such immortalizes them in a shrine containing their caskets. King Torture is so fanatically devoted to being a villain, he willingly amputates his own arm to attach a chainsaw to defeat Masayoshi and turn him into his latest cyborg comrade. King Torture is killed when he is impaled on the sharp severed limb of one of his life size figures and activates the missile that will kickstart the transformation of humanity before dying of his wounds. Hidenori manages to destroy the missile with a motorcycle at the last second, ending Torture's plans. Upon death, King Torture's monsters will shout "Viva Torture."

From Beyond is an alien organization that provided Torture with the power to make monsters. From Beyond often uses stylish promotional videos to introduce the next monster that it sends to the Earth. The organization is broken up into smaller groups which are confronted by the Flamengers one by one. Upon death, From Beyond's monsters recite the oath "From Beyond to Heaven." The closest thing the group has to a leader is "Beyond Flamenco", a mysterious being that looks identical to Masayoshi and claims to be his brother, but who is actually a version of Masayoshi brought to this universe by Alien Flamenco who, in his crusade to destroy evil, abandoned his ideals. Beyond Flamenco commits suicide with Masayoshi's gun and the entire remaining membership of From Beyond vanishes.

Prime Minister of Japan. He spearheads an anti-vigilante campaign in order to raise his approval rating to 100%. He possesses a special suit of armor that grows stronger the higher his approval rating. The "F" in his name stands for "Flamenco," a quirk that makes Masayoshi realize that the word appears everywhere. He was later ousted after unknowingly telling the public (thanks to Konno's streaming of the battle between Masayoshi & Goto and the Prime Minister) that he spearheaded the anti-vigilante campaign to boost his approval rating and not even caring about the citizens. In actuality, he was attempting to raise his approval ratings so that the suit would be powerful enough to defeat Alien Flamenco.

A grey-haired kid in a group of middle-school delinquents who were advised to return home instead of staying out at night, in episode 1. He later appears after the defeat of Alien Flamenco, setting off an explosive that destroys Masayoshi's apartment and revealing that he had been repeating the word "flamenco" to himself over and over ever since their first meeting as well as being the person responsible for uploading the video of Masayoshi's initial campaign as Samurai Flamenco. He admits to being obsessed with Samurai Flamenco, and to wanting to look special in Masayoshi's eyes, going so far as to turn evil "for him" by attacking Masayoshi's loved ones. Officially he died of illness one year ago, a ruse perpetrated by his parents, a fact known and told by Konno, who had tracked them. Sawada is an expert at staying under the radar, causing Masayoshi to initially suspect that the boy only exists in his mind. However, near the end, Kaname (who heard Haiji with his Axe Ears moments before being run over) and Hidenori (who encountered him during his capture by the boy) also saw and know of his existence. His goal for agitating Masayoshi and his targeting of his loved ones is to turn Masayoshi into "Samurai Flamenco Darkness", an anti-hero, something he planned to fulfill by having Hidenori kill him in order to "scar" Masayoshi and give him the tragic backstory required of an anti-hero. That ultimately failed when Masayoshi refused to put on the suit and decides to accept Haiji's "love" and eventually, he was beaten up by Mari (as Flamenco Diamond) for poisoning her friends. For his crimes, he was placed into either a juvenile facility or a mental ward for his crimes and though he vowed that he will go after Masayoshi again, the latter welcomed it, provided he doesn't target his friends again, putting Haiji somewhat at ease

Other characters

 An action actor who was the star of the hero TV show called , he now likes to travel all around the world visiting his fans. He once claimed that he was Samurai Flamenco, but later becomes Masayoshi's combat trainer after he claims to the media that Samurai Flamenco is his pupil, inspired by Masayoshi's strong sense of justice. Joji is rarely around to train Masayoshi, however, due to his travels. After the fall of King Torture, Joji reveals that he is a member of a secret organization and recruits Masayoshi and four other youngsters to become the "Flamengers," explaining his frequent absences and flighty nature. He also eventually reveals that he actually is Red Axe, and has been really fighting monsters alongside other tokusatsu heroes like "Harakiri Sunshine" in secret for years. He is 43 years old. His wife is also a tokusatsu hero, "Lady Axe." He is critically injured when hit by a truck in an event orchestrated by Haiji Sawada. He eventually recovers and later becomes the director of a museum dedicated to heroes.

 A middle-aged man who works in the development department for the stationery company, Monsters Stationery, who provides Masayoshi with "legal" weapons disguised as stationery to assist in his crime-fighting work, even though his inventions were once confiscated by the government right after Masayoshi join the Flamengers. He is 48 years old. Harazuka habitually wears a protective garment of his own design under his clothing in the event of an assassination attempt, something that helped him escape grave injuries after being pushed down the stairs by Haiji.

 A competent, strict manager for the entertainment production company Caesar Pro. She is Masayoshi's employer and despite suspecting that he is Samurai Flamenco, she works hard to protect his identity until he reveals it to the public. She is 28 years old and dislikes Konno's attentions towards her. After being saved by Samurai Flamenco, she becomes nicer. She suspects that Gotō and Masayoshi are dating, and encourages Masayoshi to talk to Gotō whenever he has problems. She eventually reveals to Masayoshi that she had known he was Samurai Flamenco long before he publicly outed himself.

 Manager of the website High Rollers Hi!, a news website, he takes an interest in Samurai Flamenco and schemes to discover his true identity. He is 31 years old and has an interest in Ishihara despite her rejecting his advances - he asks her to marry him when he's in the midst of being tortured. After being tortured by King Torture, he leaves the country to recuperate. He films the video of challenge that Mari sends to King Torture, and also films the battle of the Prime Minister versus Samurai Flamenco.

 First name unknown. Gotō's co-worker at the police box, and the section chief. He prefers to keep his mind on work. He knows that Gotō cares for Masayoshi. He was watching them when Masayoshi first returned Gotō's shirt from dry-cleaning to the police box, and has been present many times when Gotō was researching Samurai Flamenco on his laptop.

Media

Anime

The series, directed by Takahiro Omori and written by Hideyuki Kurata, began airing on Fuji TV's noitamina programming block from October 10, 2013 and is being simulcast by Crunchyroll. The episodes have been collected in eleven DVD and Blu-ray volumes released between December 25, 2013 and October 22, 2014. The anime is licensed by Aniplex of America in North America, Anime Limited in the United Kingdom, and Madman Entertainment in Australia.

Manga
A manga of Samurai Flamenco titled Samurai Flamenco Another Days featuring a new story was written by Seiko Takagi and illustrated by Shō Mizusawa. The series debuted in Square Enix's G Fantasy magazine in October 2013. Its first tankōbon volume was released in Japan on March 27, 2014.

Mobile phone game
A mobage of Samurai Flamenco was released on February 28, 2014. It works on iPhone, iOS6 and Android. The genre is RPG.

Reception

The series' early episodes have been notorious for its take on the lead character facing criminals without supernatural abilities and the episodes focused on the introducing the cast which have often been found likeable. Although Carl Kimlinger from Anime News Network found the early episodes underwhelming, he noted the show became more entertaining the more episodes he watched. Otaku USAs Joseph Luster compared these episodes with the films Kick-Ass and James Gunn's Super noting that Samurai Flamenco employed similar elements in its own fashion. David Cabrera from the same site listed it as his favorite series from 2013 due to its transitions that allow for several events to happen across the series.

Cabrera notes that starting in episode 7, Samurai Flamenco goes through a genre shift that surprised reviewers. Kimlinger commented that the new story arc "would qualify as a baffling train wreck, if only the arc wasn't so... good" highly praising the execution of its episodes based on the mixture between the character's actions and the sci-fi elements. Luster had a similar reaction, commenting how this transition allowed further character development to Masayoshi and his friends as they had to deal with the new threat. Despite enjoying these episodes, Andy Hanley from UK Anime Network feared the story might take itself too seriously resulting in unappealing episodes. Kimlinger addressed the second half of the series by stating that "at first each new twist and bizarre addition is greeted with shock and bafflement. But as with any magic trick, the novelty eventually wears off, and the conspicuous lack of a real narrative payoff begins to weigh heavily on us, dulling our reaction to a kind of half-bored curiosity at what will come out next" criticizing the delivery of certain story arcs and describing some plot twists as nonsensical, while still giving praise to its sense of humor and lack of stagnation. The series has also been criticized for its poor animation with Hanley finding episode 11 to be one of the most badly animated ones.

References

External links
  
  
  
 
 

2013 anime television series debuts
Fuji TV original programming
Action anime and manga
Anime with original screenplays
Aniplex
Comedy anime and manga
Gangan Comics manga
Noitamina
Manglobe
Superheroes in anime and manga